Per Andreas Bild (born 3 October 1971) is a Swedish former professional footballer who played as a defensive midfielder. He won the 2001 Allsvenskan with Hammarby IF and appeared twice for the Sweden national team.

Club career 
He played for Östers IF (1991–1998), Hammarby IF (1999–2001), and IF Brommapojkarna (2002–2004). He scored twice as he helped Hammarby win the 2001 Allsvenskan.

International career 
Bild won a total of 34 youth caps for the Sweden U17, U19, and U21 teams. He made his full international debut for Sweden in a friendly game against Thailand on 11 February 1997, when he played for 64 minutes before being replaced by Anders Andersson. He won his second and final cap for Sweden in a friendly game against Japan on 13 February 1997 when he came on as a substitute for Peter Wibrån in the 86th minute.

Honours
Hammarby

• Allsvenskan: 2001

Personal life 
He is the brother of Fredrik Bild, son of Per-Olof Bild and grand nephew of Harry Bild.

References

1971 births
Living people
Association football midfielders
Swedish footballers
Sweden youth international footballers
Allsvenskan players
Östers IF players
Hammarby Fotboll players
IF Brommapojkarna players
Sweden international footballers